Grandjean Fjord is a fjord in King Christian X Land, East Greenland. Administratively it is part of the Northeast Greenland National Park zone.

History
This fjord was mapped in 1932 during the Three-year Expedition to East Greenland led by Lauge Koch. In August of the same year it was surveyed by Gunnar Seidenfaden. Koch named it after Commander Emil Valdemar Asger Grandjean (1889–1948), then chief of the Royal Danish Navy Air Service

Geography
Grandjean Fjord opens to the east, between Cape Negri to the south and Cape Buch to the north. Its mouth is located in the northwestern area of Hochstetter Bay, by the northern entrance of Fligely Fjord, northwest of Kuhn Island and south of the mouth area of Ardencaple Fjord.

Grandjean Fjord separates Thomas Thomsen Land in the south from C. H. Ostenfeldland to the north. There are high mountains on both sides of the fjord. Betulahavn is a bay in the SW side of the central stretch of the fjord.

Bibliography
A. K. Higgins, Jane A. Gilotti, M. Paul Smith (eds.), The Greenland Caledonides: Evolution of the Northeast Margin of Laurentia.

See also
List of fjords of Greenland

References

External links
Geology of North-East Greenland
 Spatial and temporal patterns of fine structure, and vertical mixing processes in Greenland fjords

Fjords of Greenland

ceb:Grandjean Fjord
nl:Grandjeanfjord
sv:Grandjean Fjord